is a railway station in the city of  Ishinomaki, Miyagi, Japan, operated by the East Japan Railway Company (JR East).

Lines
Rikuzen-Yamashita Station is served by the Senseki Line (including the Senseki-Tōhoku Line).

Station layout
The station has one island platform connected to the station building by a level crossing. The station is staffed.

Platforms

History

It was renamed Rikuzen-Yamashita Station on May 1, 1944.

The station building was destroyed in the 2011 Tōhoku earthquake and tsunami on 11 March 2011. A new station building was opened on 3 March 2012.

Passenger statistics
In fiscal 2018, the  station was used by an average of 944 passengers daily (boarding passengers only).

Surrounding area

 Ishinomaki Police Station
 Ishinomaki Technical High School
 Ishinomaki Kobunkan High School
 Ishinomaki Yamashita Junior High School

See also
 List of railway stations in Japan

References

External links

  

Stations of East Japan Railway Company
Railway stations in Miyagi Prefecture
Senseki Line
Railway stations in Japan opened in 1939
Ishinomaki